Meadowtown Centre is a 420,000 sq. ft. power centre in Pitt Meadows, British Columbia.

Anchors

Real Canadian Superstore
Winners
Homesense
Sport Chek
Michael's
Cineplex Odeon
BC Liquor Store
Reitmans
Pier 1 Imports
Jysk
Tim Hortons

References

Pitt Meadows
Power centres (retail) in Canada